Georgios Koltsis (born 22 October 1974) is a Greek retired football defender and later manager.

References

1974 births
Living people
Greek footballers
Kavala F.C. players
Paniliakos F.C. players
Panachaiki F.C. players
Apollon Pontou FC players
Levadiakos F.C. players
Ilioupoli F.C. players
Ilisiakos F.C. players
Greek football managers
PAS Lamia 1964
Xanthi F.C. managers
Association football defenders
Footballers from Aridaia